The 2008 congressional elections in Wisconsin were held on November 4, 2008, to determine who would represent the state of Wisconsin in the United States House of Representatives. Representatives were elected for two-year terms; those elected served in the 111th Congress from January 3, 2009, until January 3, 2011.  The election coincided with the 2008 U.S. presidential election and other Wisconsin elections.

Wisconsin has eight seats in the House, apportioned according to the 2000 United States Census. Its 2007-2008 congressional delegation consisted of five Democrats and three Republicans. That remained unchanged after the 2008 congressional elections in Wisconsin as all incumbent candidates won re-election, although CQ Politics had forecasted Wisconsin's 8 district to be at some risk for the incumbent party. As of 2023, this is the last election when Democrats won a majority of congressional districts from Wisconsin.

Overview

District 1

In this relatively moderate district in southeast Wisconsin, incumbent Republican Congressman Paul Ryan has enjoyed popularity and faced no serious challenge from Democratic nominee, Marge Krupp, a chemist. Despite Barack Obama's strong performance in Wisconsin that year in the presidential election, Ryan was re-elected overwhelmingly.

District 2

In this very liberal district based in the Madison metropolitan area, incumbent Democratic Congresswoman Tammy Baldwin, the first openly lesbian member of the House, easily turned away a challenge from Republican candidate Peter Theron and won her sixth term with nearly seventy percent of the vote.

District 3

In this relatively liberal district based in western Wisconsin, incumbent Democratic Congressman Ron Kind easily won a seventh term over Republican challenger Paul Stark.

District 4

Incumbent Democratic Congresswoman Gwen Moore, running for her third term, faced easy re-election prospects in this very liberal district based in Milwaukee; no Republican candidate even filed to run against her. Moore crushed independent candidate Michael LaForest in a landslide.

District 5

In the wealthiest and most conservative district in Wisconsin, based in the northern suburbs of Milwaukee, long-serving incumbent Republican Congressman Jim Sensenbrenner easily defeated his only challenger, independent candidate Robert R. Raymond, to win a sixteenth term in Congress.

District 6

This traditionally conservative district based in the Oshkosh-Neenah, Metropolitan Statistical Area was narrowly won by Democratic nominee Barack Obama in the 2008 election, but long-serving Republican incumbent Congressman Tom Petri held a tight grip on his seat. Petri sought and won a sixteenth term against Democratic candidate Roger Kittelson, winning handily.

District 7

Long-serving incumbent Democratic Congressman Dave Obey held an iron grip on this district based in northwestern Wisconsin for forty years. Seeking a twenty-first term in Congress, Obey was overwhelmingly re-elected again over Republican challenger Dan Mielke despite the centrist nature of the district.

District 8

Incumbent Congressman Steve Kagen faced off against former Wisconsin State Assembly Speaker John Gard for a second time in this Republican-leaning district that is based in northeastern Wisconsin and that includes the cities of Green Bay and Appleton. Seeking a second term, Kagen defeated Gard by a larger margin than he did in 2006, allowing him to keep this swing district under Democratic control.

References

External links
State of Wisconsin Congressional Districts
Elections Division from the Wisconsin Government Accountability Board
Wisconsin U.S. House Races from 2008 Race Tracker
Campaign contributions for Wisconsin congressional races from OpenSecrets
Politics Plus State and Local Elections from the Milwaukee Journal Sentinel newspaper

2008
Wisconsin
United States House of Representatives